Five Thousand an Hour is a 1918 American silent comedy-drama film, directed by Ralph Ince. It stars Hale Hamilton, Lucille Lee Stewart, and Gilbert Douglas, and was released on November 25, 1918.

Cast list
 Hale Hamilton as Johnny Gamble
 Lucille Lee Stewart as Constance Joy
 Gilbert Douglas as Paul Gresham
 Florence Short as Polly Parsons
 Robert Whittier as Jim Collaton
 Robert Middlemass as Ashley Loring
 Isabel O'Madigan as Mrs. Patty Boyden
 William Frederic as Col. Bouncer
 Warren Cook as Raymond Courtney
 Charles Edwards as Boise
 Hardee Kirkland as Mortimer Washer
 Jack Bulger as Birchard
 William Cohill

References

External links 
 
 
 

Films directed by Ralph Ince
Metro Pictures films
Films based on American novels
American silent feature films
American black-and-white films
1910s English-language films
1918 comedy-drama films
1918 films
1910s American films
Silent American comedy-drama films